The Dothan station, also known as Atlantic Coastline Railroad Passenger Depot, is a historic train station in Dothan, Alabama. It was built in 1907 as the largest and busiest on the Atlantic Coast Line Railroad between Montgomery, Alabama, and Thomasville, Georgia and replaced a former freight depot.  The Atlantic Coast Line merged with the Seaboard Air Line Railroad in 1967 to form the Seaboard Coast Line Railroad. In 1971, Amtrak took over passenger rail service in the United States and Dothan station was served by the Floridian until 1979.

The depot is two stories, with a one-story portion on the western third.  The first story's hipped roof wraps around the entire building, and has deep eaves supported by large brackets.  All windows are two-over-two sashes with heavy granite sills and lintels.  Double-leaf doors with transoms led to the two waiting rooms.  The track side has a projecting bay that served as the ticketing window.

The station was listed on the National Register of Historic Places in 1994.

References

National Register of Historic Places in Houston County, Alabama
Railway stations on the National Register of Historic Places in Alabama
Railway stations in the United States opened in 1907
Railway stations closed in 1979
Buildings and structures in Dothan, Alabama
Former Amtrak stations in Alabama
Transportation buildings and structures in Houston County, Alabama
1907 establishments in Alabama
Former Atlantic Coast Line Railroad stations